Slum Jagathu (Slum World in English) is a not-for-profit magazine, published and edited by Isaac Arul Selva, who dwells in the slums of Bangalore, India, slums surrounding rich neighborhoods and IT companies.  The magazine was launched in 2000. "This is a unique project for slum-dwellers by slum-dwellers", he says.  "It is not just a magazine. It is a voice echoing the struggle of slum-dwellers. Our ultimate aim is to inspire a movement to fight for our basic rights and amenities."

Printed in the Kannada language, it provides its readers with information and resources, to take advantage of existing government programs designed to alleviate poverty.  The local readership as of 2004 was quoted as 2500 monthly.

See also
 List of Kannada-language magazines
 Media in Karnataka

References

External links

 Amezing Indian Story in Times now
 One World Story
 BBC news article on the magazine
 CNN IBN Television coverage on the magazine
 DNA Daily coverage on the magazine
 Tehelka article by Issac Arul Selva
 Documentary Film by us on Water
 National Policy and Advocacy Council on Homelessness (NPACH) Cities Alliance newsletter, October 2004
 News story on us
 Hindu New Story on us

Kannada-language magazines
Magazines established in 2000
Monthly magazines published in India
Political magazines published in India
Slums in India